WDRC may refer to:

WDRC (AM), a radio station (1360 AM) licensed to Hartford, Connecticut, United States
WDRC-FM, a radio station (102.9 FM) licensed to Hartford, Connecticut, United States
 Wade Diagnostic and Reception Center, a facility of the Forcht-Wade Correctional Center prison in Louisiana, United States